Carlos G. Mijares Bracho (April 26, 1930 – March 19, 2015) was a Mexican architect and founder of the "grupo Menhir".

Mijares studied at the Escuela Nacional de Arquitectura of the Universidad Nacional Autónoma de México (UNAM) from 1948 to 1952. After 1954 he lectured in architecture at the Universidad Iberoamericana (UIA). He was considered to have been a master of brick wall work. His works include religious, industrial and residential architecture. An influence of the Finnish architect Alvar Aalto is quite distinctive in several of his works. Later he taught at the UNAM. He was a member of the Sistema Nacional de Creadores de Arte (SNCA). 

Mijares Bracho died on March 19, 2015, aged 84.

Selected works
 „Mijares“ house, „Fernández“ house and „Díaz Barreiro“ house, Mexico City
 Governmental computer center building, Morelia
 Several Fertilizantes del Bajío buildings, Salamanca
 Vehículos Automotores Mexicanos area, Toluca
 "Perpetuo Socorro" church, Ciudad Hidalgo
 "San José" church, Jungapeo
 "San José Obrero" church, La Coyota
 Christ Church, Distrito Federal
 Catedral de Sal, Zipaquirá, Colombia
 Espacio Lúdico, Bogotá, Colombia

Further reading
 SantaMaria, R. and S. Palleroni, "La Obra de Carlos Mijares:  Tiempo y otra Construcciones" (Escala, Bogota, Seville, 1989, 1991, 2000). 202 pp

External links
 
 Carlos Mijares in the Ibero-American Institute's catalogue

References

Mexican architects
National Autonomous University of Mexico alumni
Academic staff of Universidad Iberoamericana
Academic staff of the National Autonomous University of Mexico
People from Mexico City
1930 births
2015 deaths